Euplerinae, more commonly known as malagasy civets, is a subfamily of carnivorans that includes four species restricted to Madagascar. Together with the subfamily Galidiinae, which also only occurs on Madagascar, it forms the family Eupleridae. Members of this subfamily, which include the fossa (Cryptoprocta ferox), falanoucs (Eupleres goudotii and Eupleres major) and Malagasy civet (Fossa fossana), were placed in families like Felidae and Viverridae before genetic data indicated their consanguinity with other Madagascar carnivorans. Within the subfamily, the falanouc and Malagasy civet are more closely related to each other than to the fossa.

Classification

Phylogenetic tree
The phylogenetic relationships of Malagasy civets (Euplerinae) are shown in the following cladogram:

See also
 List of mammals of Madagascar

References

Euplerids
Taxa named by Jean-Charles Chenu